WinTuition is an American game show created as an original series for Game Show Network, on which it originally ran from December 9, 2002 to April 1, 2003. The game had a school-oriented theme in which three contestants competed to answer questions on general school-based subjects in an attempt to win a $50,000 college fund, hence the name of the show. The show was hosted by Marc Summers and announced by Burton Richardson. Henry Winkler served as the show's executive producer.

History
WinTuition went into production and first aired on GSN in late 2002. The show was produced by Henry Winkler and hosted by Marc Summers. Kennedy, who at the time was the host of Friend or Foe?, hosted one episode in 2003 as part of an April Fool's Day prank in which the hosts of Game Show Network's original series traded places.

Burton Richardson announced the show, and a male model identified as "Gorgeous George" Davidson occasionally brought out props related to the questions.

Gameplay
The main game was divided into twelve levels, or "grades," with each level containing question material appropriate to that particular grade. The subject of each grade was announced before the question was asked. All three players started the game with 500 points.

Round 1: Elementary School (1st-5th Grade)
One buzz-in question per grade level was asked for the first four grades, while in fifth grade every player was asked his/her own question as part of a spelling bee or matching/guessing game. Correct answers were worth 100 points each; missed questions cost the player 100. On some episodes, an elementary school age student provided a home viewer question before the commercial break at the end of this round, then gave the answer after the break ended.

Round 2: Middle School (6th-8th Grade)
Questions in this round had several correct answers, each of which was worth 250 points. Each player got to give one answer, starting with whoever buzzed in first, after which any player who had answered correctly could try to give answers to any or all remaining parts of the question. A miss at any time cost the player no points, but froze him/her out of the rest of the question. Four correct answers were possible in 6th and 7th grades, seven correct in 8th. After all three grades had been played, the lowest-scoring player was "expelled" from the game and received consolation prizes; a second-place tie was broken via a buzz-in tiebreaker question.

The first player to give a correct answer in this round won a bonus prize.

Round 3: High School (9th-12th Grade)
Players alternated answering questions, one per grade, starting with the leader. Correct answers scored 500 points, while wrong ones deducted 500. In addition, each player could use one "Cut Class" card during the round, forcing the opponent to answer an unwanted question. The buzzers were not used in this round.

After the 12th grade question, the "Senior Year Showdown" was played, focusing on a single subject chosen from two alternatives offered by Summers. Players continued to answer alternating questions worth 500 points each, starting with the leader. As soon as a player missed a question, he/she was out of the round, meaning that the trailing player would have a chance to catch up if the leader made a mistake first. The player with the most points won a prize package and moved on to the bonus round, while the other received consolation prizes.

Bonus Round: The $50,000 Final Exam
Seated at the "Desk of Destiny" (a small wooden school desk), the winner had 60 seconds to answer 10 questions in various subjects. He/she could not return to passed or missed questions. Each correct answer awarded the winner $250, with a $50,000 college fund awarded for 10 correct answers.

Airing history
WinTuition aired daily at 8:30 p.m. eastern time on GSN. The show lasted for one season.

References

2002 American television series debuts
2003 American television series endings
2000s American game shows
Game Show Network original programming
English-language television shows